Mac Siúrtáin, aka Mac Jordan and Jordan, is the name of a Connacht family of Norman-Irish origins.

Ancestry

The family take their name from the Norman knight, Jordan de Exeter, whose descendants became known as Mac Siúrtáin - the Gaelic form of Jordan - and were based in County Mayo.

The de Exeter's were originally from the town of Exeter, Devon, and are recorded in Dublin and Meath from the 1230s onwards. They included Henry de Exeter, Mayor of Dublin c.1240-41; Michael d'Exeter, Bishop of Ossory 1289-1302; Richard de Exeter, killed 1287; Sir Richard de Exeter, died 1327; and Sir Stephen de Exeter, fl. 1280-1316.

Mac Jordan of Gallen

The descendants of Jordan de Exeter settled in Connacht, mainly in what is now  County Mayo. The territory they conquered, Gailenga (later known as the barony of Gallen), was the southern part of Luighne (also known as Sliabh Lugha), whose lords were the clan Ó Gadhra. The de Exeters expelled the Ó Gadhras into Coolavin, County Sligo, while the clan Ó hEaghra retained the name Luighne for their territory to the north.

Becoming steadily Gaelicised over a number of generations, the family as a whole were known as the Mac Siúrtáin (or Mac Jordan, i.e., the sons of Jordan). Only the chief of the clan was entitled to be called de Exeter.

John de Exeter/John na Conairte Mac Jordan is commonly believed to be the common ancestor of all Jordans of Connacht, except for a family called Mac Jordan Duff, descended from Jocelyn de Angulo.

Chiefs of the Name

 John Mac Siúrtáin, died 1394.
 Thomas Mac Siúrtáin, fl. 1497.
 Thomas Dubh Mac Siúrtáin, died 1584.

De Exeter family tree

  Stephen, dead by 1280.      Jordan, fl. 1239-58.              John de Exeter, died 1261.
 =Johanna, alive 1280.       =Basilia, fl. 1253                 |
  |                           |                                 |
  |                           |___              Richard de Exeter, d. 1287.
  Sir Stephen, d. 1316        |                 |               |
 =Matilda, fl. 1318.          |                 |               |_
  |                       Meiler, k. 1289.  Jordan Óge          |                |
  |                           |                 |               |                |
  Sir Stephen, fl. 1302.      |             |               Sir Richard    John, b.1270
                          Meiler, k. 1317. |    |               |
                                           |    |               |__
                             John na Conairte  Jordan Bacach    |             |
                                      |                         |             |
                                      |                         Simon     Richard of Derver
                             Clan Jordan of Mayo               fl.1335      fl. 1347.

See also

 Jordan de Exeter
 Richard de Exeter
 Sir Richard de Exeter
 Sir Stephen de Exeter
 Jordan (name)

References

 The History of the County of Mayo to the Close of the Sixteenth Century. With illustrations and three maps, Hubert T. Knox. Originally published 1908, Hogges Figgies and Co. Dublin. Reprinted by De Burca rare books, 1982. .

Normans in Ireland
Irish families
Surnames of Irish origin
Surnames
Irish-language surnames